Fords Lake is a man made,  lake with an average depth of  on Buttermilk Creek in Lackawanna County, Pennsylvania constructed in 1995.  Owned by the state of Pennsylvania and controlled by the state Fish and Boat Commission, it is used for recreation purposes, such as boating, which is limited to electric powered motors and un-powered boats and for fishing.  A surfaced launch ramp and parking facilities are also present upon entrance of the lake.

See also
List of lakes in Pennsylvania

References

External links
PA Fish and Boat Commission
Findlakes.com

1995 establishments in Pennsylvania
Reservoirs in Pennsylvania
Bodies of water of Lackawanna County, Pennsylvania
Tourist attractions in Lackawanna County, Pennsylvania